Molenhoek is a village located in the provinces of Limburg and Gelderland, Netherlands.

Molenhoek may also refer to:

 Molenhoek, Druten, Gelderland
 Molenhoek, Rosmalen, North Brabant
 Molenhoek, Overijssel, a village in Overijssel